Saco  is a city in York County, Maine, United States. The population was 20,381 at the 2020 census. It is home to Ferry Beach State Park, Funtown Splashtown USA, Thornton Academy, as well as General Dynamics Armament Systems (also known by its former name, Saco Defense), a subsidiary of the defense contractor General Dynamics. Saco sees much tourism during summer months due to its amusement parks, Camp Ellis Beach and Pier, Ferry Beach State Park, and proximity to Old Orchard Beach.

Saco is part of the Portland–South Portland–Biddeford, Maine metropolitan statistical area. Saco's twin-city is Biddeford.

History

This was territory of the Abenaki tribe whose fortified village was located up the Sokokis Trail at Pequawket (now Fryeburg).  There was a settlement at the mouth of the Saco river, with homes and permanent cultivation, at the time of contact with Europeans in the early 1600s.

In July 1607, 500 warriors led by sakmow (Grand Chief) of the Mi'kmaq First Nations Henri Membertou attacked the village at present-day Saco, killing 20 of their braves, including two of their leaders, Onmechin and Marchin, leading to conflict that lasted until 1615.

Settled in 1631 as part of Winter Harbor (as Biddeford Pool was first known). The government of Maine, under Ferdinando Gorges, was based in the town from 1636 to 1653. It would be reorganized in 1653 by the Massachusetts General Court as Saco, which would be renamed Biddeford in 1718.

The settlement was attacked by Indians in 1675 during King Philip's War. Settlers moved to the mouth of the river, and the houses and mills they left behind were burned. Saco lay in contested territory between New England and New France, which recruited the Indians as allies. In 1689 during King William's War, it was again attacked, with some residents taken captive. Hostilities intensified from 1702 until 1709, then ceased in 1713 with the Treaty of Portsmouth. The community was rebuilt and in 1718 incorporated as Biddeford. Peace would not last, however, and the town was again attacked in 1723 during Dummer's War, when it contained 14 garrisons. In August and September 1723, there were Indian raids on Saco, Maine and Dover, New Hampshire. But in 1724, a Massachusetts militia destroyed Norridgewock, an Abenaki stronghold on the Kennebec River organizing raids on English settlements. The region became less dangerous, especially after the French defeat in 1745 at the Battle of Louisburg. The French and Indian Wars finally ended with the 1763 Treaty of Paris.

In 1762, the northeastern bank of Biddeford separated as the District of Pepperrellborough, named for Sir William Pepperrell, hero of the Battle of Louisburg and late proprietor of the town. Amos Chase was one of the pioneers of Pepperrellborough. He was chosen as a selectman at the first town meeting, and served as the first deacon of the Congregational Church. Dea. Chase was one of the area's largest taxpayers, and was prominent in civic affairs during the American Revolution, serving on the town's Committee of Correspondence and Committee of Inspection.

The district was incorporated as the Town of Pepperellborough in 1775. Inhabitants found the name to be cumbersome, so in 1805 it was renamed Saco. It would be incorporated as a city in 1867. Saco became a center for lumbering, with log drives down the river from Little Falls Plantation (now Dayton, Lyman, Hollis and part of Limington). At Saco Falls, the timber was cut by 17 sawmills. In 1827, the community produced  of sawn lumber, some of which was used for shipbuilding.

On Factory Island, the Saco Iron Works began operation in 1811. The Saco Manufacturing Company established a cotton mill in 1826, and a canal was dug through rock to provide water power. The mill burned in 1830, but was replaced in 1831 by the York Manufacturing Company. With the arrival of the Portland, Saco and Portsmouth Railroad in 1842, Factory Island developed into a major textile manufacturing center, with extensive brick mills dominating the Saco and Biddeford waterfronts. Other businesses included foundries, belting and harnessmaking, and machine shops. But the New England textile industry faded in the 20th century, and the York Manufacturing Company would close in 1958. The prosperous mill town era, however, left behind much fine architecture in the Georgian, Federal, Greek Revival and Victorian styles. Many buildings are now listed on the National Register of Historic Places.

Still in operation, it is one of the earliest examples of the Rural cemetery movement.

Saco has taken steps to make the city more environmentally friendly. In early 2007 a small wind turbine was erected near the water treatment plant at the foot of Front street. Another larger wind turbine was erected on the top of York Hill in December 2007, and was expected to generate power for the new train station for Amtrak's Downeaster, although this was torn down in 2018 as the wind turbine never came close to generating the amount of energy promised. Saco also has two growing business parks.

Geography
Situated beside Saco Bay on the Gulf of Maine, Saco is drained by the Saco River.

Saco borders the city of Biddeford, as well as the towns of Scarborough, Buxton, Dayton and Old Orchard Beach.

Terrain
Saco contains a wide variety of landforms, including beaches, fields, forests, bogs, and urban areas.

This is an archive of documents related to erosion issues in the Camp Ellis section of Saco and Saco River maintenance.

Demographics

2010 census
As of the census of 2010, there were 18,482 people, 7,623 households, and 4,925 families residing in the city. The racial makeup of the city was 95.7% White, 0.7% African American, 0.2% Native American, 1.7% Asian, 0.3% from other races, and 1.4% from two or more races. Hispanic or Latino of any race were 1.3% of the population.

There were 7,623 households, of which 28.5% had children under the age of 18 living with them, 49.2% were married couples living together, 10.7% had a female householder with no husband present, 4.7% had a male householder with no wife present, and 35.4% were non-families. 27.0% of all households were made up of individuals, and 10% had someone living alone who was 65 years of age or older. The average household size was 2.38 and the average family size was 2.88.

The median age in the city was 41.9 years. 21.9% of residents were under the age of 18; 7.6% were between the ages of 18 and 24; 25.6% were from 25 to 44; 30.5% were from 45 to 64; and 14.3% were 65 years of age or older. The gender makeup of the city was 48.3% male and 51.7% female.

2000 census
As of the census of 2000, there were 16,822 people, 6,801 households, and 4,590 families residing in the city. The racial makeup of the city was 97.91% White, 0.32% African American, 0.15% Native American, 0.51% Asian, 0.09% Pacific Islander, 0.10% from other races, and 0.93% from two or more races. Hispanic or Latino of any race were 0.58% of the population.

There were 6,801 households, out of which 33.1% had children under the age of 18 living with them, 53.3% were married couples living together, 10.6% had a female householder with no husband present, and 32.5% were non-families. 25.2% of all households were made up of individuals, and 10.1% had someone living alone who was 65 years of age or older. The average household size was 2.44 and the average family size was 2.93.

In the city, the population was spread out, with 25.0% under the age of 18, 6.8% from 18 to 24, 32.1% from 25 to 44, 22.2% from 45 to 64, and 13.9% who were 65 years of age or older. The median age was 37 years. For every 100 females, there were 91.0 males. For every 100 females age 18 and over, there were 87.7 males.

The median income for a household in the city was $45,105, and the median income for a family was $52,724. Males had a median income of $35,446 versus $25,585 for females. The per capita income for the city was $20,444. About 7.1% of families and 8.2% of the population were below the poverty line, including 9.4% of those under age 18 and 10.8% of those age 65 or over.

Voter registration

Saco is divided into 7 voting wards, represented by: Ward 1 Councilor Marshall Archer, Ward 2 Councilor Jim Purdy, Ward 3 Councilor Joseph Gunn, Ward 4 Councilor Michael Burman, Ward 5 Councilor Phillip Hatch, Ward 6 Councilor Jodi MacPhail, and Ward 7 Councilor Nathan Johnston.

Education

List of schools

 Fairfield School (K–2)
 Young School (K–2)
 C.K. Burns School (3–5)
 Saco Middle School (6–8) 
 Thornton Academy (9–12)
 Thornton Middle School (6–8) - Arundel, ME student overflow from partner RSU, RSU 21
 Saco Transition Program (6–12)
 The School At Sweetser (1–12)
 Saco Island School (9–12)

Previous schools

 Notre Dame de Lourdes School (K–8) – Closed in 2009 due to budget constraints and lack of students.

Higher education

 University College has a campus located in Saco.

Infrastructure

Transportation

The Saco Transportation Center provides transportation between Portland and Boston via the Downeaster passenger train.

Saco is accessible from Interstate 95, U.S. Route 1 and Interstate 195. State routes 5, 9, 112, and 117 also serve the city. Taxis serve the Tri-City Area (Saco, Biddeford, and Old Orchard Beach).

The ShuttleBus and Zoom Bus provide local transportation.

Environmental contamination
Since 1960, the City of Saco has owned and operated the Saco Municipal Landfill . The site consists of four distinct disposal areas, the fourth of which is a recently closed landfill that accepted household waste and tannery sludge containing chromium and other heavy metals, as well as volatile organic compounds. In February 1990 the site was placed on the National Priorities List. From 1992 to 1994, EPA studied the groundwater contamination. in September 1996, EPA started capping the landfill. In 2000, institutional controls were established, which restrict site uses.

Notable people 

 Henry A. Barrows, actor
 Liberty Billings, Florida senator
 Samuel Brannan, businessman and pioneer
 Amos Chase, Saco pioneer
 Justin Chenette, Maine state representative
 Richard Cutts, U.S. congressman
 Arthur P. Fairfield, naval officer 
 John Fairfield, U.S. congressman and senator; 16th governor of Maine
 Rory Ferreira, musician better known as Milo
 George Lincoln Goodale, botanist 
 Charles Henry Granger, painter
 Elizabeth Deering Hanscom, English professor
 John Johnson, pioneer photographer and inventor
 Bryan Kaenrath, Maine state representative
 Cyrus King, U.S. congressman
 Slugger Labbe, crew chief with NASCAR
 James Felix McKenney, actor
 Isaac Lawrence Milliken, 16th mayor of Chicago
 Edith Nourse Rogers, U.S. congresswoman
 Emery J. San Souci, 53rd governor of Rhode Island 
 John Fairfield Scammon, U.S. congressman
 Ether Shepley, Maine state congressman, U.S. senator and jurist
 George F. Shepley, general in the Union Army and 18th Governor of Louisiana 
 John Wingate Thornton, lawyer, historian, and author

Sites of interest
 Dyer Library
 Funtown Splashtown USA
Saco Heath Preserve
 Ferry Beach State Park

References

External links

 
 Biddeford Saco Chamber of Commerce

	

 
Cities in York County, Maine
Populated places established in 1631
Portland metropolitan area, Maine
Cities in Maine
Populated coastal places in Maine
1631 establishments in the Thirteen Colonies